Julien Henri Carette (23 December 1897 – 20 July 1966) was a French film actor. He appeared in more than 120 films between 1931 and 1964.

Selected filmography

 American Love (1931)
 George and Georgette (1934)
 My Heart Is Calling You (1934)
 Dora Nelson (1935)
 Fanfare of Love (1935)
 Marinella (1936)
 27 Rue de la Paix (1936)
 The Grand Illusion (1937)
 The Kings of Sport (1937)
 Lights of Paris (1938)
 La Bête Humaine (1938)
 La Marseillaise (1938)
 Coral Reefs (1939)
 The Rules of the Game (1939)
 Behind the Facade (1939)
 Beating Heart (1940)
 Thunder Over Paris (1940)
 Goodbye Leonard (1943)
 Madly in Love (1943)
 Night Shift (1944)
 Sylvie and the Ghost (1946)
 Love Around the House (1947)
 The Murdered Model (1948)
 Keep an Eye on Amelia (1949)
 Night Round (1949)
 Une si jolie petite plage (1949)
 Branquignol (1949)
 The Winner's Circle (1950)
 Without Leaving an Address (1951)
 His Last Twelve Hours (1951)
 Bernard and the Lion (1951)
 Rome-Paris-Rome (1951)
 Matrimonial Agency (1952)
 Au diable la vertu (1953)
 Good Lord Without Confession (1953)
 What Scoundrels Men Are! (1953)
 Fraternité (1954)
 House of Ricordi (1954)
 Si Paris nous était conté (1956)
 Meeting in Paris (1956)
 Paris, Palace Hotel (1956)
 Crime and Punishment (1956)
 I'll Get Back to Kandara (1956)
 Archimède le clochard (1959)
 The Green Mare (1959)

References

External links

1897 births
1966 deaths
Male actors from Paris
French male film actors
20th-century French male actors